Jeffrey Paul Hastings (born June 25, 1959) is an American former ski jumper who competed at the 1984 Winter Olympics in Sarajevo. He is a longtime ski jumping analyst for televised coverage of Winter Olympics competitions. He was named one of the 50 Greatest Sports Figures from Vermont by Sports Illustrated.

Career
When competing at the 1984 Olympic Winter Games, Hastings finished fourth on the large hill, placing just behind Pavel Ploc of Czechoslovakia, 0.2 of a point out of the medals. This was the best American finish in ski jumping since the 1920s. Hastings finished fourth overall on the World Cup circuit in 1984, was US national champion four times, and won a World Cup in Lake Placid on the large hill in 1983.

World cup

Standings

Wins

Personal life
Hastings is a graduate of Williams College (1981) and the Tuck School of Business at Dartmouth College (1990). Since retiring from competition in 1985, he has served as a television ski-jumping analyst for several Winter Olympic Games, from Calgary 1988 to Vancouver 2010.

Hastings is the President of PRO-CUT International, an automotive specialty product supply company located in West Lebanon, New Hampshire. He lives in Hanover, New Hampshire, with his wife and three children. Hastings' younger brother Chris Hastings competed in the Olympic Winter Games in Calgary in 1988 and was a two-time national champion.

References

External links

1959 births
Living people
American male ski jumpers
Ski jumpers at the 1984 Winter Olympics
Olympic ski jumpers of the United States
Tuck School of Business alumni
Williams College alumni
People from Mountain Home, Idaho
Sportspeople from Vermont